Óláfs saga or The Saga of King Olaf can refer to:

The various versions of Óláfs saga Tryggvasonar
The various versions of Óláfs saga helga
Óláfs saga kyrra in Heimskringla
The Saga of King Olaf, a poem by Henry Wadsworth Longfellow